Johan Ragnar Wiksten (26 February 1914 – 22 September 2000) was a Swedish skier. He competed in the military patrol at the 1936 Summer Olympics.

References

1914 births
2000 deaths
People from Piteå
Swedish military patrol (sport) runners
Winter Olympics competitors for Sweden
Military patrol competitors at the 1936 Winter Olympics